Athlone is an area of Durban, South Africa. The area is located to the north of the Umgeni River, and together with neighboring Umgeni Park is known colloquially as Riverside. The Athlone Bridge built in 1927 over the Umgeni River, links the suburb and greater Durban North to the central suburb of Stamford Hill.

References 

Suburbs of Durban